The Jaguar XJ (X350) is a full-size four-door luxury saloon manufactured and marketed worldwide by Jaguar for model years 2003–2009 as the third generation of the Jaguar XJ saloon — carrying the internal designation X350 and the internal designation X358, following its 2007 intermediate facelift.

Both the X350 and X358 were available with a six-speed automatic transmission, a range of petrol and diesel engines (V6, V8 and supercharged V8), numerous trim levels — and short wheelbase (2003–2009) or long wheelbase (2005–2009) configurations. Extended-length models were the longest vehicles Jaguar had manufactured. 

The X350 was noted for its advanced electrical systems, self-leveling adaptive air suspension and full aluminium unibody chassis and bodywork, among the first for a mass-produced automobile. The bodyshell (body in white) was 40 per cent lighter and 50 percent stiffer than its predecessor, despite its increased overall size.

Styling of the third generation was a conservative evolution of the previous XJ's styling; its slatted grille recalling the grille of the original 1968 XJ. Exterior styling was by principal designer Tom Owen along with Sandy Boyes, under the design directorship of Geoff Lawson, who died midway through the project, and his successor Ian Callum. the XJ's interior was styled by Giles Taylor. Manufacturing took place at Jaguar's Castle Bromwich Assembly in Birmingham.

With an unpainted and highly polished example of its all-alloy body shell on display, the X350 debuted at the 2002 Paris Motor Show. The full X350/358 generation largely coincided with Jaguar's ownership by Ford's Premier Automotive Group — until Tata Motors purchased Jaguar in 2008. Production ended in March 2009 after seven years with a total production of 83,566.

X350

Body and chassis 
The X350's aluminium bodyshell used an aerospace construction method, a hybrid of adhesive bonding and rivet joinery and known as rivet-bonding or riv-bonding — an industry first in volume automotive production. Both chassis and body formed an aluminium unibody structure. Using aluminium rather than steel required new techniques, technological development and production layout along with significant investment.

The stressed aluminium unibody used 15 aluminium castings, 35 extrusions and 284 stampings bonded using 120 yards of robotically-applied, heat-cured, aerospace-grade epoxy adhesives and approximately 3,200 self-piercing zinc-coated, boron steel rivets — Jaguar's first use of self-piercing rivets. In addition to the rivets, which do not require a predrilled or punched hole, each rivet making its own hole on insertion, the process also uses a small number of nuts, bolts, and spot welds. Castings and extrusions accounted for about 11 percent of the XJ bodyshell.

To ensure manufacturing feasibility, numerous styling elements required a redesign to accommodate forming in aluminium rather than steel, including the bonnet profiles, especially around the headlamps; the radii in the wing-to-bumper gaps and the rear wing/door shut pressing; the side light configuration and the bodyside ‘haunch’. Chief Program engineer Russ Varney said the XJ also taught Jaguar "about the springback of stamped parts, where the pieces won't keep their exact shape."

To reduce front-end collision repair costs and ameliorate increased insurance rates associated with aluminium construction, the body was designed to withstand an impact of 10 mph without structural damage and used a bolt-on front-end module (BOFE). A hydroformed aluminium extrusion with an energy-absorbing foam cover formed a bumper beam cross-member, to provide strength and crushability in the event of a minor collision. Sacrificial extruded aluminium "crash cans" were designed to protect the body structure and front-end componentry.

Steel is used for front and rear subframes and magnesium (as strong as aluminium while 30 per cent lighter) is used for seat frames and lateral instrument panel beams.

Jaguar had previously and prominently used aluminium construction, in the XK120 which was produced in the 1940s and used aluminium panels, along with its C‑Type and D‑Type race cars as well as the 1960s E-Type which used aluminium chassis and body design.

Ford retained the bonding and riveting patents of the XJ's aluminium monocoque body, when it sold Jaguar to Indian automobile manufacturer Tata Motors in 2008.

Design and engineering

The X350 employed a multi-link layout with four-wheel self-levelling adaptive air suspension instead of the previous generation's double wishbone IRS. The suspension was controlled electronically, requiring no intervention from the driver, to adjust damper settings (in milliseconds) and adjust the ride and handling under varying conditions — its electronic control system marketed as Computer Active Technology Suspension (CATS). The air suspension was designed to activate every 24 hours to level the vehicle when parked and not in use.

From the previous generation, the overall body was wider, longer and higher — with increased head, leg, shoulder and cargo room — and carried a .32 coefficient of drag. Door shut lines were engineered uniformly to a 3.8 mm gap to adjacent body elements. The bonnet and boot were engineered to 3.5 mm to adjacent body elements. The doors opened to 62 degrees front and 65 degrees rear. The long wheelbase model, introduced in 2005, was the longest vehicle Jaguar had manufactured at the time. The turning radius was increased by 13 inches over the standard-wheelbase model.

The 12-volt wiring system used multiplexing to integrate four systems: low-speed, event-driven communications around the body; high-speed powertrain system (engine, transmission, air suspension system and instrument cluster); fibre-optic communication protocol for telematics, navigation, phone, voice activation, audio and multimedia systems; and safety systems protocol.

Equipment
At introduction, standard equipment included mirror-matched walnut burl wood grain trim throughout the interior, piano-black center console trim, leather seating, wood-trimmed steering wheel, leather-covered overhead assist handles, dual-zone automatic climate control, glass electric tilt and slide sunroof with single-touch open/close, rain-sensing automatic wipers, automatic headlights, front fog lights, 24 lamp LED taillights, front and rear parking sensors, boot power latching mechanism, electrically adjustable steering wheel with memory and entry/exit function, electrochromic self-dimming side mirrors with compass, a trip computer, electrically adjustable pedals with 2.5 inch travel, 4 power points, all window one-touch up/down power operation, metallic paint (no-cost option), a full-size spare tyre, electronically tilt and telescoping steering wheel, keyless entry, puddle lamps, electronic park brake, and 8-speaker, 320-watt sound system with boot-mounted 6-CD changer and in-dash CD player.

Safety systems included four-channel anti-lock brakes with emergency brake assist, traction control, dynamic stability control, and front, side thorax as well as full-length side curtain airbags. Electronic coordination of seatbelts and airbags, marketed as Advanced Restraint Technology System (ARTS), was designed to sense crash severity, driver position and seatbelt status using ultrasonic and seat weight sensors to optimize airbag deployment force.

Optional equipment included xenon headlights, headlight powerwash, adaptive cruise control, multi-stage heated seats, heated steering wheel, DVD navigation (with postal code programming where country-provided), soft-grain ruched (micro-pleated) leather seats and trim, electrically adjustable pedals and rear-seat multimedia entertainment system for CD listening or DVD movie watching via front seat head restraint-mounted video screens.

At introduction, upper trim levels offered soft grain leather, leatherette fascia top and contrasting seat piping, inlain Peruvian boxwood trim, lambswool rugs, 320-watt, 12-speaker audio system, 4-zone heating and cooling system, 16-way adjustable front seats, rear heated seats — and optional electrically reclining rear seat and power rear centre sunblind.

The rear seating of long-wheelbase models could be equipped with a fixed or power-adjustable bench or individually powered and heated seats.

Engines

The V8 engines remained in the new model, but were the revised and more powerful versions found in the 2003 S-Type.

The  3.2 L V8 from the previous model was replaced by the 3.0 L V6 from the X-Type and S-Type. The V6 powers the XJ6, while the XJ8 was powered by a naturally aspirated V8. The XJR was powered by a supercharged 4.2 L V8. The XJ6 and the XJ TDVi are the only X350 models not sold in the Americas.

In 2005, Jaguar introduced the diesel-powered XJ TDVi, featuring the same Ford-Peugeot-developed 2.7-litre twin-turbocharged V6 found in the S-Type.

Both X350 and X358 used a six-speed automatic transmission manufactured by ZF Friedrichshafen.

North American XJ models were equipped with the  naturally aspirated engine or an optional  supercharged 4.2 L V8 engine.

Trim levels

At introduction, the XJ was marketed worldwide in various trim levels, including XJ8, XJ Vanden Plas and XJR in North America, and XJ6, XJ8, XJ Sovereign in the UK. For the 2005 model year, Jaguar introduced a long-wheelbase variant of the X350. For 2007, the premium model was reintroduced as the Jaguar Sovereign when the Super V8 and Daimler versions were dropped.
Vanden Plas/Sovereign

Super V8 Portfolio: In early 2005, Jaguar announced the Super V8 Portfolio for the 2006 model year, a limited-edition trim level of the flagship Super V8 saloon. It debuted at the New York International Auto Show in March 2005 with a base price of US$115,995. The Portfolio trim level included a DVD player and 7-inch screens in the rear headrests. The Super V8 Portfolio, marketed in North American markets, became available in August 2005 and was exclusively available in two colours, Black Cherry and Winter Gold.

Daimler Super Eight/Super V8: The Super 8 was the most expensive model, with the XJR being the second most expensive model in the range. The Super V8, which debuted in the 2003 model year in the new X350 body style, was initially of a short-wheelbase configuration. This became an option in 2004 when a long-wheelbase configuration was introduced, along with the supercharged variation of the XJ8 with the more luxurious Vanden Plas, or Daimler interior. Its primary competitor was the Maserati Quattroporte. A distinctive wire mesh grille and chrome-finished side mirrors set the Super 8 and the XJR apart from the less expensive XJ saloons. In 2005, the Super V8 model was replaced by the Daimler Super Eight in all markets other than North America. The Daimler Super Eight was essentially the same car, but with the addition of a different grille, boxwood inlays finished in wood veneer and several other interior luxuries as standard. Daimler's US equivalent was no longer known as the Vanden Plas, but the Super 8. The Vanden Plas name was used on models that would be known as Sovereign elsewhere. Daimler has been the State Car for the British Prime Minister since the 1980s, although Daimlers were replaced with Sentinel trim Jaguars in 2011 when the next generation of the XJ was introduced.

X356 (2005 facelift)

The facelifted X350 debuted in 2005 for the model year 2006 with a revised front grille and with slightly redesigned front fenders. Some vehicle electronics systems have been updated.

Trim levels

X358 (2007 facelift)

The facelifted X350 debuted in February 2007 for the model year 2008 with a revised front grille and front bumper assembly featuring a prominent lower grille. A Jaguar emblem within the grille replaced the previous bonnet-mounted bonnet ornament.

The front lights were revised and door mirrors incorporated side repeaters. The front wings had prominent faux side vents, and the side sills, rear bumper and taillights were revised. The interior featured redesigned front seats.

Trim levels

Markets 
UK:
As of November 2007, the following XJ models were available in the UK:
 XJ 2.7D Executive
 XJ 2.7D Sport Premium
 3.0-litre Executive
 2.7D, 3.0-litre, and 4.2-litre Sovereign
 4.2-litre supercharged XJR
 Daimler Super Eight

Models with the 2.7-litre diesel or with the 3.0-litre petrol V6 engines are also known as the XJ6 (since the engines have six cylinders), while the 4.2-litre V8 petrol engine mounted in the Sovereign results in that model being known as the XJ8. Also notice that the model list for the UK does not include the 3.5-litre V8 engine available in Germany, for example.

Germany: 
From May 2007, the following models were available in Germany:

 XJ6 2.7-litre Diesel Classic
 XJ6 2.7-litre Diesel Executive
 XJ6 3-litre Executive
 XJ8 3.5-litre Executive
 XJ8 4.2-litre Executive
 XJ6 2.7-litre Diesel Sovereign
 XJ8 3.5-litre Sovereign
 XJ8 4.2-litre Sovereign
 XJR 4.2-litre V8 Kompressor (i.e. the supercharged V8 variant)
 Daimler Super Eight

North America:
From May 2007, the following XJ models were available in North America:
 XJ8
 XJ8L
 XJR
 XJ Vanden Plas (this model was equivalent to 'Daimler' in Europe; the name 'Daimler' was not used by Jaguar in the US because of copyright)
 XJ Super V8 (this model was equivalent to 'Daimler' in Europe; the name 'Daimler' was not used by Jaguar in the US because of copyright)
 XJ Super V8 Portfolio (limited edition)

Note: the XJ6 and the XJ 2.7D are not available in the US, unlike in Europe. The 'L' on the XJ8L badge denotes the long-wheelbase version.

Engines 
All engines were paired with a ZF six-speed automatic transmission. The XJ6 petrol versions have a lower final drive ratio.

References

External links

Jaguar global brochure 
Jaguar DE brochure 

XJ4
Sports sedans
Rear-wheel-drive vehicles
Cars introduced in 2002
Cars discontinued in 2009